The 1988 Carson–Newman Eagles football team was an American football team that represented Carson–Newman College (renamed Carson–Newman University in 2012) as a member of the South Atlantic Conference (SAC) during the 1988 NAIA Division I football season. In its ninth year under head coach Ken Sparks, the team compiled a 12–2 record (5–2 against conference opponents), tied for the SAC championship, and defeated  in the Champion Bowl to win the NAIA national championship. 

It was the fourth of five national championships (1983, 1984, 1986, 1988 and 1989) won by Carson–Newman during the 1980s.

Schedule

References

Carson–Newman Eagles
Carson–Newman Eagles football seasons
NAIA Football National Champions
South Atlantic Conference football champion seasons
Carson–Newman Eagles football